Filip Krstić (born 24 September 1988) is a professional football player who plays for Eintracht Mahlsdorf. Born in Germany, he represented Serbia internationally.

Career
Krstić, a German-born Serbian, began his football career at SpVgg Unterhaching in 1995 at the age of 7, then joined FC Bayern Munich in the summer of 1999 when he was 11. He moved to Hertha BSC in late 2005 at age 17 and joined their youth A-team. Krstić played for two and a half years in Berlin, before joining Valencia CF in July 2007. After only six months with Valencia CF, he left to sign for the Serie A club Livorno in Italy, and played his first game on 18 May 2008 against Empoli F.C. Krstić then played in Livorno for one year before signing a contract in Germany with Arminia Bielefeld's reserve team. After one year in their reserves, Krstić left Arminia Bielefeld for SV Babelsberg 03. In July 2010, he spent time as trialist with Dutch club SC Cambuur. In July 2011, he signed for SpVgg Unterhaching, the first club he played for as a young footballer. Following his second stretch with the Munich-based club, Krstić left for a brief stretch of time with FSV Frankfurt before signing with Berliner AK 07 in 2012. After 29 appearances for Berliner AK, Krstić signed with Carl Zeiss Jena in 2013.

Position
Krstić is a variable defender who can play in either central defense or as a left fullback.

International career
The German-born Krstić was a member of the U-17 Serbian national team at the 2005 UEFA European Championship and also played for the Serbian U-19 national team.

References

External links
 
 

1988 births
Footballers from Munich
German people of Serbian descent
Living people
Serbian footballers
Serbia youth international footballers
Association football central defenders
Association football fullbacks
Hertha BSC players
Valencia CF players
U.S. Livorno 1915 players
Arminia Bielefeld II players
SV Babelsberg 03 players
SpVgg Unterhaching players
FSV Frankfurt players
Berliner AK 07 players
FC Carl Zeiss Jena players
FSV Union Fürstenwalde players
Serie A players
Oberliga (football) players
Regionalliga players
Bayernliga players
Serbian expatriate footballers
Expatriate footballers in Spain
Serbian expatriate sportspeople in Spain
Expatriate footballers in Italy
Serbian expatriate sportspeople in Italy